Scusi lei è normale? (i.e. "Pardon Me, Are You Normal?") is a 1979  commedia sexy all'italiana directed by  Umberto Lenzi and starring Renzo Montagnani, Ray Lovelock and Anna Maria Rizzoli.

Plot

Cast 

Renzo Montagnani as Gustavo Sparvieri
Anna Maria Rizzoli as  Anna Grisaglia
Ray Lovelock as  Franco Astuti
Aldo Maccione as Police Commissioner Aldo Lo Curcio
Enzo Cerusico as  Nicola Proietti/Nicolè  
Marco Tulli as  Grisaglia
Luca Sportelli as Friar Martino 
Tom Felleghy as Pharmacist
Sammy Barbot

See also
 List of Italian films of 1979

References

External links

Scusi lei è normale? at Variety Distribution

Commedia sexy all'italiana
1970s sex comedy films
Films directed by Umberto Lenzi
Films scored by Franco Micalizzi
1979 comedy films
1979 films
1970s Italian films